Stringtown is an unincorporated community in Center Township, Vanderburgh County, in the U.S. state of Indiana.

It is located within the city limits of Evansville.

History

An old variant name of the community was called Zipp, which was named after Frank Zipp Jr., an early postmaster. A post office was established under the name Zipp in 1881, and remained in operation until it was discontinued in 1902.

Stringtown was so named on account of its houses being strung along the road.

Geography

References

Unincorporated communities in Vanderburgh County, Indiana
Unincorporated communities in Indiana